Wuthering Heights is a modern-day adaptation of Emily Brontë's classic 1847 novel that aired on MTV in 2003 and was later released on DVD. It stars Erika Christensen, Mike Vogel, Christopher Masterson, Katherine Heigl, John Doe and Aimee Osbourne. The screenplay was by Max Enscoe and Annie deYoung, from an original screenplay by Jim Steinman and Patricia Knop. Although set in California, the filming location was Cabo Rojo, Puerto Rico.

The executive producer was Jim Steinman. It features his song "The Future Ain't What It Used to Be", which originally appeared on Original Sin, the concept album he wrote and produced for Pandora's Box. Wuthering Heights is one of Steinman's favourite books, and it was the inspiration for his song "It's All Coming Back to Me Now."

Plot summary

Cast
 Erika Christensen as Cate
 Katelin Petersen as Young Cate/Cate's Daughter
 Mike Vogel as Heath
 Adam Taylor Gordon as Young Heath
 Christopher Kennedy Masterson as Edward
 Johnny Whitworth as Hendrix
Seth Adkins as Young Hendrix
 Katherine M. Heigl as Isabel Linton
 John Doe as Earnshaw
 Aimee Osbourne as Raquelle

Soundtrack album
The original soundtrack album (produced by Steinman, except where indicated below) was co-released by Ravenous Records and the MTV Original Movies label in November 2003. The track list is:

"Prelude: The Future Ain't What It Used to Be" (Jim Steinman)
Vocals by Erika Christensen (a capella)
"More" (Andrew Eldritch/Steinman)
Vocals by Erika Christensen and Mike Vogel
Co-produced by Steven Rinkoff and Jeff Bova
Arranged by Steinman and Bova
"I Will Crumble" (Hewitt Huntwork)
Vocals by Erika Christensen and Mike Vogel
Vocal tracks produced by Steinman and Rinkoff
Instrumental track produced and arranged by Bova
"If It Ain't Broke (Break It)" (Steinman)
Vocals by Mike Vogel
Co-produced by Rinkoff, Bova and Pat Thrall
Arranged by Steinman and Bova
Guitars: Thrall
Drums: Sammy Merendino
"Shine" (Huntwork)
Vocals by Mike Vogel
Produced by Steinman and Rinkoff
Guitars: Huntwork
"The Future Ain't What It Used To Be" (Steinman)
Vocals by Erika Christensen
Co-produced by Rinkoff
Piano: Roy Bittan

"If It Ain't Broke (Break It)" and "The Future Ain't What It Used to Be" were both recorded by Meat Loaf for his 2006 album Bat Out of Hell III: The Monster Is Loose. The latter had previously appeared on the Steinman-produced 1989 concept album Original Sin, by Pandora's Box. "More" was originally written and recorded for The Sisters of Mercy's 1990 album Vision Thing.

Personnel
 Soundtrack Produced by Jim Steinman
 Music Supervisor: Amy Rosen
 Recorded and Mixed by: Steven Rinkoff
 Production coordinator for Jim Steinman Productions: Don Ketteler
 Recorded and mixed at The Hit Factory, Bovaland and Dome Logic (NYC)
 Mastered at The Hit Factory by Tony Gillis

Production notes
This movie was filmed in Puerto Rico.

References

External links
 
 
 Official site

2003 television films
2003 films
Films directed by Suri Krishnamma
Films based on Wuthering Heights
Films shot in Puerto Rico
Films scored by Stephen Trask
2003 drama films
American television films